Providence is an unincorporated community in Providence Township, Lac qui Parle County, Minnesota, United States.

Notes

Unincorporated communities in Lac qui Parle County, Minnesota
Unincorporated communities in Minnesota